The Men's 800m T46 had its First Round held on September 14 at 20:27 and the Final on September 15 at 17:24.

Medalists

Results

References
Round 1 - Heat 1
Round 1 - Heat 2
Round 1 - Heat 3
Final

Athletics at the 2008 Summer Paralympics